Dirk Wanner Proper (born 24 February 2002) is a Dutch professional footballer who plays as a midfielder for Eredivisie club NEC.

Club career
Born in Elst, Gelderland, Proper started playing football at amateur club SV Spero before joining the NEC youth academy at the age of nine, where he was quickly regarded as one of the club's most promising prospects. He made his professional debut in the Dutch second-tier Eerste Divisie on 13 December 2019 in a 3–2 loss to Almere City. In January 2020, Proper was definitively promoted to the NEC first team. He gradually became integrated into the first team during this 2019–20 season, with head coach François Gesthuizen utilising him as an attacking midfielder. 

In July 2020, Proper's contract was extended until the summer of 2023. Proper scored his first goal on 3 October 2020 in the 6–0 win over Eindhoven. On 23 May 2021, Proper won promotion to the Eredivisie with NEC, by beating NAC Breda 2–1 in the final of the play-offs.

Proper made his debut in the top-level Eredivisie on 14 August 2021, the first matchday of the 2021–22 season, starting in a 5–0 away loss to Ajax at the Johan Cruyff Arena.

International career
From under-15 level, Proper has been part of Netherlands youth teams. With the Netherlands under-17 team, he won the 2019 UEFA European Under-17 Championship. He also participated in the 2019 FIFA U-17 World Cup.

Career statistics

Honours
Netherlands U17
UEFA European Under-17 Championship: 2019

References

External links
 

2002 births
Living people
People from Overbetuwe
Footballers from Gelderland
Dutch footballers
Association football midfielders
Netherlands youth international footballers
NEC Nijmegen players
Eerste Divisie players
Eredivisie players